The Celtic Psalter (University of Edinburgh MS 56) is a 114-page, 11th-century psalter and is likely to be the oldest Scottish book to be still kept within Scotland.

Its exact origins are unknown, however it is similar to books made in Irish and Scottish monasteries at the time, which strongly suggests it was produced somewhere within Scotland, possibly by monks in a monastery in Iona.

Contents

The book contains the Hebrew version of the psalter handwritten in Irish minuscule. Psalms at the beginning and end of the manuscript have been replaced or completed at a later date. The margins of the book have been badly cropped, removing all catchwords and clipping off parts of psalm initials in places.

Psalms start with an illuminated initial and more simply coloured initials on every other line after. These illuminated initials are depicted as a complex interwoven depiction of some sort of animal, including birds, dragon-like creatures and a fish. Illuminations are filled in with red, blue, green, yellow and purple pigment. 

As well as initials there are two full pages of illumination. The first page of full illumination has been painted over with an imitation of 11th century English style work with only the knotwork in the corners remaining of the original. The book is in excellent condition with the ink writing remaining perfectly legible and pigmentation bright and vibrant despite its age.

Many bindings for the book have been made over time as the original has long since been lost. The current binding was created by Douglas Cockerell in 1914 in Celtic style.

History

The book is dated sometime in early 1000s or perhaps earlier. Analysis of gold pigment by A.P. Laurie on one of the pages shows it contains river-washed gold dust which has at latest been found in the Canterbury psalter in the early 1000s and is absent past the 11th century. The earliest owner known of the manuscript is John Reid, chancellor of Aberdeen, in 1537, who has left an inscription within. There are no other marks of ownership apart from an erased inscription on the first page. It was then acquired by the University of Edinburgh library at some point before 1636 as shown by a manuscript catalogue of that date.

A common rumour is that the book was commissioned for Saint Margaret of Scotland as a love token by Malcom III since the book has been dated to around that period. Analysis from researchers such as A.P. Laurie show that the manuscript is likely older making this rumour quite unlikely.

References

Further reading

External Links 
Celtic Psalter University of Edinburgh (MS 56), digital version.

Illuminated psalters
11th-century illuminated manuscripts
11th-century Latin books
University of Edinburgh